Rita Rudner (born September 17, 1953)  is an American comedian. Beginning her career as a Broadway dancer, Rudner noticed the lack of female comedians in New York City and turned to stand-up comedy, where she has flourished for over three decades. Her performance on a variety of HBO specials and numerous appearances on The Tonight Show with Johnny Carson, helped establish Rudner as one of the premier comics to emerge from the comedy boom of the 1980s.

Early life
Rudner was born in Miami, Florida, the daughter of Frances, an Orthodox Jewish homemaker from Brooklyn, and Abe Rudner, a lawyer from the Catskills. Rudner grew up in a Jewish family in Coconut Grove. She began taking ballet lessons at age four. Her mother died of breast cancer when she was 13 and her father remarried. She struggled to get along with her stepmother and felt a desire to become independent. After graduating from high school at 15, Rudner left Miami and went to New York City to embark on a career as a dancer. Beginning with a small role in Promises, Promises (joining the production in 1970), she appeared in several Broadway shows, including the now-legendary original productions of Follies (1971) and Mack & Mabel (1974). She took over the role of Lily St. Regis in the long-running musical Annie circa 1979, and stayed with the company for over a year, leaving in 1981.

Career
After starting her standup career in the late 1970s, Rudner made her network television debut on Late Night with David Letterman in 1982. She appeared frequently on television shows both in the US and the UK (recording a six-part series on BBC2 in 1990 in the latter), and she appeared often on The Tonight Show Starring Johnny Carson. She has recorded several award-winning comedy specials, most notably Rita Rudner: Born to Be Mild and Rita Rudner: Married Without Children for HBO and Rita Rudner: Live From Las Vegas for PBS in 2008.

Rudner and her husband wrote the screenplay of the 1992 film Peter's Friends, in which she also acted. Rudner also has a role as the character Bunny in her husband's 2011 film Thanks, which had its world premiere at the 2011 Palm Springs Film Festival.

Rudner is the author of the books I Still Have It; I Just Can't Remember Where I Put It, Naked Beneath My Clothes and the novels Tickled Pink and Turning The Tables. She has written several screenplays and plays with her husband. In January 2016, she appeared in a new play titled Act 3... alongside Charles Shaughnessy at the Laguna Playhouse, directed by Martin Bergman.

Since 2001, Rudner has performed almost exclusively in Las Vegas, selling almost two million tickets and becoming the longest-running solo comedy show in Las Vegas. She moved to a larger theater at The Venetian in January 2011. She also created and hosted the syndicated improvisational comedy show Ask Rita, which mimicked the format of a talk/advice show. For this she received a Gracie Allen Award from the Alliance for Women in Media Foundation (AWM). In May 2009 she performed for Senator Harry Reid and President Barack Obama at Caesars Palace alongside Bette Midler and Sheryl Crow. In 2019, Rudner returned somewhat to her dancer roots when she starred in Two's A Crowd, a musical comedy written by her, Bergman and singer/songwriter Jason Feddy. The show began at the Laguna Playhouse before transferring to 59e59 Theatre in Manhattan. She is currently completing her autobiography My Life In Dog Years.

Personal life
Rudner is married to Martin Bergman, a British producer. They have an adopted daughter.

Filmography

Film

Television

Writer

Comedy specials

Bibliography

References

External links

 
 
 2011 Interview

Living people
American stand-up comedians
American women comedians
American film actresses
American voice actresses
Jewish American actresses
Actresses from Miami
American women screenwriters
20th-century American actresses
21st-century American actresses
20th-century American comedians
21st-century American comedians
Jewish American female comedians
Screenwriters from Florida
Las Vegas shows
21st-century American Jews
1953 births